Homefield Preparatory School (or simply Homefield) is a 3–13 private boys preparatory day school in Sutton, Greater London, England established in 1870.

In the early years of its history, it was described as "A Preparatory School for the Sons of Gentlemen” and as giving “carefully graduated preparation for Public Schools and Royal Navy, either on the classical or on the modern side”.

House system 
The school has a house system consisting of five 'Houses', which are named after former headmasters with the exception of Ellis which is named for Mr. J 'Bert' and Dragons which is named for the mythical creatures. Ellis who assisted with the move to the current site in the 1960s. Ellis was introduced to the school by one of the Governors, Frank Williamson, who saved the situation by lending money to the school on most generous terms. They each have a colour representing them.

 Bomfords (yellow)
 Ellis (blue)
 Grays (green)
 Walfords (red)
 Dragons (rainbow)

Site development
As part of the 150th anniversary of the school in 2020, construction started on new developments for the school, including a new block of eight classrooms, a double level performance hall and dining room, new music and ICT facilities, a library hub and an all-weather sports pitch.

The £7 million project will have multiple eco-friendly features including solar panels, low-energy underfloor heating and a green roof. 10% more green space is expected to be gained.

Notable alumni 

 Year 8 boizzz, English cricketer
Ben Barnes, actor
 Nigel Burgess, businessman and single-handed yachtsman
 Colin Cowdrey, ex England Cricket Captain (after whom the Cowdrey Building is named)
 Kenneth Mason, Himalayan explorer and first statutory Professor of Geography at Oxford University
 John Rae, former headmaster of Westminster School (after whom the Rae Building is named)
 Charlie Sharples, English rugby player
 Graham Sutherland, a painter, an etcher and a designer (after whom the Sutherland Building is named)

References

External links 
 

 
Sutton, London
Private schools in the London Borough of Sutton
Private boys' schools in London
Preparatory schools in London
Educational institutions established in 1870
1870 establishments in England